2001–02 Albanian Cup was the 50th season of Albania's annual cup competition. It began on August 18, 2001 with the First Round and ended on June 1, 2002 with the Final match. The winners of the competition qualified for the 2002-03 first round of the UEFA Europa League. Tirana were the defending champions, having won their eleventh Albanian Cup last season. The cup was won by Tirana.

The rounds were played in a two-legged format similar to those of European competitions. If the aggregated score was tied after both games, the team with the higher number of away goals advanced. If the number of away goals was equal in both games, the match was decided by extra time and a penalty shootout, if necessary.

First round
Games were played on August 18 & 24 2001.

|}

Second round
All sixteen teams of the 2000–01 Superliga and First Division entered in this round. First legs were played on January 26, 2002 and the second legs were played on February 1, 2002.

|}

Quarter-finals
In this round entered the 8 winners from the previous round.

|}

Tirana advanced to the semi finals.

Teuta advanced to the semi finals.

Dinamo Tirana advanced to the semi finals.

Elbasani advanced to the semi finals.

Semi-finals
In this round entered the four winners from the previous round.

|}

Tirana advanced to the final.

Dinamo Tirana advanced to the final.

Final

References

External links
 Official website 

Cup
2001–02 domestic association football cups
2001-02